David Robert Smith (born on 17 June 1971 in Pontefract, Yorkshire) is an English professional darts player from Knottingley, Wakefield, West Yorkshire who currently playing in the British Darts Organisation events. He has nickname The Rhino.

Career

Dave enjoyed most success in the PDC between 2002–2004, which included a quarter final in the 2003 UK Open, and qualifying for three other tournaments through a one-off qualifier.

Smith has earned a full PDC Pro Tour card for the 2011 and 2012 seasons via his world ranking.

World Championship Performances

PDC
 2003: Last 40: (lost to Mark Holden 3–4) (sets)

References

External links

 Official website

English darts players
Living people
1971 births
British Darts Organisation players
Professional Darts Corporation former tour card holders
Sportspeople from Pontefract